Khvarenah (also spelled khwarenah or xwarra(h)) is an Avestan word for a Zoroastrian concept literally denoting "glory" or "splendour" but understood as a divine mystical force or power projected upon and aiding the appointed. The neuter noun thus also connotes "(divine) royal glory", reflecting the perceived divine empowerment of kings. The term also carries a secondary meaning of "(good) fortune"; those who possess it are able to complete their mission or function.

In 3rd- to 7th-century Sassanid-era inscriptions as well as in the 9th- to 12th-century texts of Zoroastrian tradition, the word appears as Zoroastrian Middle Persian khwarrah, rendered with the Pahlavi ideogram GDE, reflecting Aramaic gada "fortune". Middle Persian khwarrah continues as New Persian k(h)orra. These variants, which are assumed to be learned borrowings from the Avestan, are the only Iranian language forms with an initial 'xᵛ-'. In all other dialects, the word has an initial f- (see details under related terms, below).

Etymology and related terms
Avestan khvarenah is probably derived from Proto-Avestan *hvar "to shine", nominalized with the -nah suffix. Proto-Avestan *hvar is in turn related to Old Indic svar with the same meaning, and together descending from Proto-Indo-Iranian *súHr̥ "to shine", ultimately from Proto-Indo-European *sóhr "to shine". Other proposals suggest a linguistic relationship with Avestan xᵛar- "to eat".

Of the numerous Iranian languages in which the word is attested, the initial xᵛ- is  evident only as Avestan khvar(e)nah and as Zoroastrian Middle Persian khwarrah, from which New Persian khorra then derives. In other Iranian dialects the word has an f- form, for instance as Median and Old Persian farnah-, from which Middle- and New Persian farr(ah) and adjectival farrokh derive. For many decades, the f- form was believed to represent a specific Median sound-law change of proto-Iranian xᵛ- to f-. The hypothesis has since been shown to be untenable, and the proto-Iranian form is today reconstructed as *hu̯, preserved in Avestan as xᵛ- and dissimilated as f- in other Iranian dialects.

Pre-Christian Georgian kings of the Pharnavazid dynasty were divinely assigned kxwarrah and its loss usually led to the monarch's imminent death or overthrow in Georgian kingship. Many of the monarchs had names based on this etymological root like Pharnavaz, Pharnajom and Pharasmanes. The word was borrowed into the Georgian language as p‘ar[n].

In the Iranian languages of the Middle Period, the word is also attested as Bactrian far(r)o, Khotanese pharra, Parthian farh, Sogdian f(a)rn, and Ossetic farnae and farn, though in these languages the word does not necessarily signify "glory" or "fortune": 
In Buddhism, Sogdian farn and Khotanese pharra signified a "position of a Buddha," that is, with "dignity" or "high position." This meaning subsequently passed into Tocharian. In Manicheanism, Sogdian frn signified "luck" and was a designator of the "first luminary". Manichean Parthian farh again signifies "glory." In Scytho-Sarmatian and Alan culture, Digoron Ossetic farnae and Iron Ossetic farn signified "peace, happiness, abundance, fortune."

The term also appears as a borrowing in Armenian pʿarkʿ, but with a greater range of meaning than in Iranian languages.

In scripture
Bisyllabic khvarenah is only attested once in the Gathas, the oldest hymns of Zoroastrianism and considered to have been composed by the prophet himself. The one instance of Gathic khvarenah occurs in Yasna 51.18, where the word appears to mean royal glory. The primary source of information on khvarenah comes from the Yashts, the younger Avesta's collection of 21 hymns dedicated to individual divinities.

Two distinct forms of khvarenah are discernible in Yasht 19:
 kavam khvarenah (kauuaēm xᵛarənah), the fortune of the kavis, the Kayanian kings
 akhvaretem khvarenah (axᵛarətəm xᵛarənah), glory that both divinities and mortals should strive for.
Similarly Yasht 18, although nominally dedicated to Arshtat, is a short 9-verse ode to a third variant of khvarenah; the Iranian khvarenah (airiianəm xᵛarənah) that is created by Ahura Mazda and that is "full of milk and pastures," vanquishes the daevas and the Un-Iranians.

Yasht 19, which is nominally dedicated to Zam "Earth", further typifies khvarenah as a yazata, that is, itself "worthy of worship." The same hymn includes a list of divinities and mortals who perform their duties due to the power of khvarenah. Among these are the mythological Kayanian kings – the kavis (kauuis) – who are rulers through the grace of, and empowered by, khvarenah.

Khvarenah is however also glory held by divinities: Ahura Mazda has it (19.9-13), the Amesha Spentas have it (19.14-20), the other yazatas as well (19.21-24). Yima loses it thrice, in turn to Mithra, Thraetaona and Keresaspa. Khvarenah assumes the shape of a bird when leaving Yima. (19.35-36, 19.82)

According to Yasht 13.14, the waters flow, the plants spring forth, and the winds blow through the khvarenah of the Fravashis. In Yasna 68.11, the waters of Aredvi Sura are invoked to bestow radiance and glory. Khvarenah is also associated with the waters in other texts; with the world-sea Vourukasha in Yasht 19.51 and 19.56-57; with the Helmand river in Yasht 19.66ff. It is also identified with Haoma, together with which it plays a seminal role in the legend of the birth of Zoroaster. In these passages, khvarenah has a seminal and germinal implication, being both fiery fluid and living seed.

In Yasna 60.2, the family priest is seen to request joy and blessings for the righteous, good nature, truth, prosperity, power, and glory for the house in which he offers prayers. The hymn to Mithra speaks of the divinity as the "dispenser of khvarenah" (Yasht 10.16, 10.128, 10.141). Other texts describe Mithra as "most endowed with glory" (Yasht 19.35, Vendidad 19.15).

In Yasht 19.46, Akem Manah, the demon of "evil purpose" attempts (but fails) to seize khvarenah. The Iranian khvarenah and Dahman,  the hypostasis of prayer, render Bushyasta - the demoness of "sloth" – powerless (Yasht 10.97, 13.4).

At the final renovation of the world, the royal glory will follow the Saoshyants (Yasht 19.89).

In tradition
In the 9th-12th century texts of Zoroastrian tradition khvarenah (→ Middle Persian khwarrah) is a spiritual force that exists before the creation of the tan-gohr, the mortal body (Bundahishn II.7ff, Zadspram 3.75). In these later texts, the glory appears to be acquirable through learning and knowledge (Bundahishn II.9ff).

Khwarrah continues to be identified with astral bodies (Dadistan-i Denig I.25, I.35-36), but its primary function is in its role as the divine glory of kings, the continuation of the Avestan notion of the kavam khvarenah. New in tradition is an identification of khwarrah with religion, as in "the great khwarrah-bestowing force of the pure religion" (Dadistan-i Denig I.36)

The Kar-namag i Ardashir, a collection of hagiographic legends related to Ardashir, the founder of the Sassanid Empire, includes (4.11.16 and 4.11.22-23) a tale in which Ardashir – who at that point in the story is still a vassal of the Arsacid Parthians – escapes from the court of the last Arsacid king, Ardavan. In the story, Ardashir makes off with much Ardavan's treasure, as well as Ardavan's favourite concubine, and is being chased by Ardavan and his troops. On the road, Ardavan and his contingent are overtaken by an enormous ram, which is also following Ardashir. Ardavan's religious advisors explain that the ram is the manifestation of the khwarrah of the ancient Iranian kings, which is leaving Ardavan and the Parthians in favor of a new emperor.

The representation of khwarrah as a ram reappears on Sassanid seals and as an ornament in Sassanid architecture. Khwarrah also appears in Sassanian crowns as a bird with a pearl in its beak. Depictions of khwarrah as a bird are allusions to the Avestan myth of Yasht 19.35-36, 19.82 in which khvarenah takes the shape of a bird as it leaves Yima (MP: Jamshid), a metamorphosis similar to that of the yazata of victory, Verethragna. The crown as a repository of khwarrah is also attested in the Paikuli inscription of Narseh, which describes the punishment meted out to an individual who has been "driven by Ahriman and the devs" to steal khwarrah by placing the crown on the head of a false ruler. Another ubiquitous motif in Sassanian art is the symbol of a boar, which is a representation of the protection of the yazata Verethragna (MP: Wahram) given to rulers that hold khwarrah.

The ring of kingship that appears in Sassanian investiture reliefs is often identified as representing khwarrah. This is also the case for the ring held by the bearded figure in the Achaemenid winged sun-disk symbol that is traditionally considered to represent a fravashi (MP: fravahr). The Achaemenid winged sun-disk has in its entirety also been occasionally been interpreted as a representation of khvarenah.

That khwarrah – in addition to its significance as "royal fortune" – also signified "fortune" in a general sense is demonstrated by the use of an Aramaic ideogram GDE in the Middle Persian texts of the Sassanid and post-Sassanid periods. The custom of using this Aramic ideogram to represent khvarenah is probably inherited from Achaemenid times.

Syncretic influences
"The fundamental motif of Iranian kingship, a hereditary dynastic charisma [...], which, could however be lost, was at the root of ideas that were widespread in the Hellenistic and Roman periods." For example, as the tyche basileos, fortuna regia, the saving grace (luck) of fortune of a king; and probably also the royal farrah in the tyche of the various Hellenistic rulers of the Seleucid and Arsacid periods as well as of the Kushan kings.

Because the concepts of khvarenah/khwarrah and Aramaic gd(y) circulated in the same areas and have many characteristics in common, it is possible that the Mesopotamian concept influenced the Zoroastrian one. On the other hand, khvarenah may also be a facet of Zoroastrianism's Indo-Iranian cultural inheritance since khvarenah appears to have a parallel in Indic tejas. in which kingship is likewise associated with the bright splendor and power of light and fire.

The concept of the royal khwarrah survived the 7th century downfall of the Sassanid Empire, and remained a central motif (for instance as the farr-e elahi) in the culture, philosophy and epics of Islamic Iran.

In culture
The 1995 Ossetian film "ФАРН" (en:Farn) produced for North Ossetian Television by Murat Dzhusoyty.

See also
Senmurv

References
Citations

Bibliography

 .
 .
 .
 .
 .

Yazatas
Ancient Iranian religion
Iranian words and phrases